Approximately 29,000 Indians live and work in the Maldives and almost 22,000 of them live in Malé', the capital city. They comprise nurses, teachers, managers, doctors, engineers, accountants and other professionals. Besides them, there are skilled and unskilled personnel such as technicians, masons, tailors, plumbers, and other labourers. A sizeable proportion work in the tourism-related industries. Almost all of them hold Indian citizenship though they may get absorbed in the fabric of the local society.

People from Kerala and Tamil Nadu have historically been in close contact with the Maldives, through trade, which continues till today where Indian professional and other workers contribute to the Maldivian economy and society.

See also
Hinduism in Maldives

References

Maldives
India–Maldives relations